Codex Boernerianus, designated by G, G or 012 (in the Gregory-Aland numbering of New Testament manuscripts), α 1028 (in the von Soden numbering of New Testament manuscripts), is a small New Testament codex, measuring 25 x 18 cm, written in one column per page, 20 lines per page. Using the study of comparative writing styles (paleography), the manuscript has been dated to the 9th century CE. The name of the codex derives from the theology professor Christian Frederick Boerner, to whom it once belonged. The manuscript has several gaps.

Description 
The manuscript contains the text of the Pauline epistles (excluding Hebrews) on 99 vellum leaves. The main text is in Greek with an interlinear Latin translation inserted above the Greek text (in the same manner as Codex Sangallensis 48).

The text of the codex contains six gaps (Romans 1:1-4, 2:17-24, 1 Cor. 3:8-16, 6:7-14, Col. 2:1-8, Philem. 21-25). 
Quotations from the Old Testament are marked in the left-hand margin by inverted commas (>; also known as a diplai), and Latin notation identifies a quotation (f.e. Iesaia). 
Capital letters follow regular in stichometric frequency. This means codex G was copied from a manuscript arranged in στίχοι. The codex sometimes uses minuscule letters: α, κ, ρ (of the same size as uncials). It does not use include rough breathing, smooth breathing or accent markers.

The Latin text is written in minuscule letters. The shape of Latin letters: r, s, t is characteristic of the Anglo-Saxon alphabet.

The Codex does not use the phrase ἐν Ῥώμῃ (in Rome). In Rom 1:7 this phrase was replaced by ἐν ἀγαπῃ (Latin text – in caritate et dilectione), and in 1:15 the phrase is omitted (in both Greek and Latin).

After the end of Philemon stands the title Προς Λαουδακησας αρχεται επιστολη (with interlinear Latin ad Laudicenses incipit epistola), but the apocryphal epistle is lost.

Text 
The Greek text of this codex is considered a representative of the Western text-type. The text-types are groups of different New Testament manuscripts which share specific or generally related readings, which then differ from each other group, and thus the conflicting readings can separate out the groups. These are then used to determine the original text as published; there are three main groups with names: Alexandrian, Western, and Byzantine. Textual critic Kurt Aland placed it in Category III according to his New Testament manuscript text classification system. Category III manuscripts are described as having "a small but not a negligible proportion of early readings, with a considerable encroachment of [Byzantine] readings, and significant readings from other sources as yet unidentified".

The section  is placed after , just like other manuscripts considered to be of the Western text-type (Claromontanus (D), Augiensis (F), Minuscule 88, it, and some manuscripts of Vulgate).

The Latin text has some affinity with the Latin lectionary manuscript, Liber Comicus (t), which is a Latin lectionary containing an Old Latin (Vetus Latina) text.

 Some Notable Readings

 αμα και της αναστασεως : G
 αλλα και της αναστασεως : Majority of manuscripts

 καιρω : G
 κυριω : Majority of manuscripts

 δωροφορια : G B D 
 διακονια : Majority of manuscripts

 Ιουνιαν : G C
 Ιουλιαν : Majority of manuscripts

 αναπληρωσετε : G B 1962 it vg sy sa bo goth eth
 αναπληρωσατε : Majority of manuscripts

 το αυτο φρονειν, τω αυτω συνστοιχειν : G F
 τω αυτω στοιχειν : Majority of manuscripts

 σωματα : G F
 νοηματα : Majority of manuscripts 

 Ιησου : G  B D 1739 1881 it sa bo eth
 Ιησου μη κατα σαρκα περιπατουσιν αλλα κατα πνευμα : Majority of manuscripts

 πειθοις σοφιας (plausible wisdom) : G  F
 πειθοις ανθρωπινης σοφιας λογοις :  A C L P Ψ Majority of manuscripts

The Old Irish Poem in the Codex Boernerianus 

On folio 23 verso at the bottom is written a verse in Old Irish which refers to making a pilgrimage to Rome:

Téicht doróim
mór saido · becc · torbai ·
INrí chondaigi hifoss ·
manimbera latt nífogbái ·

Mór báis mor baile 
mór coll ceille mor mire 
olais airchenn teicht dó ecaib ·
beith fo étoil · maíc · maire ·

Stokes and Strachan's translation:

Bruce M. Metzger in his book Manuscripts of the Greek Bible quotes this poem, which seems to have been written by a disappointed pilgrim.

History 
The codex was probably written by an Irish monk in the Abbey of St. Gall, Switzerland between 850-900 A.D. Ludolph Kuster was the first to recognize the 9th century date of Codex Boernerianus. The evidence for this date includes the style of the script, the smaller uncial letters in Greek, the Latin interlinear written in Anglo-Saxon minuscule, and the separation of words.

In 1670 it was in the hands of P. Junius at Leiden. The codex got its name from its first German owner, University of Leipzig professor Christian Frederick Boerner, who bought it in the Dutch Republic in the year 1705. It was collated by Kuster, described in the preface to his edition of Mill's Greek New Testament. The manuscript was designated by symbol G in the second part of Wettstein's New Testament. The text of the codex was published by Matthaei, at Meissen, in Saxony, in 1791, and supposed by him to have been written between the 8th and 12th centuries. Rettig thought that Codex Sangallensis is a part of the same book as the Codex Boernerianus.

During World War II, the codex suffered severely from water damage. Thus, the facsimile, as published in 1909, provides the most legible text. Some scholars believe this codex originally formed a unit with the Gospel manuscript Codex Sangallensis 48 (Δ/037). Boernerianus is housed now in the Saxon State Library (A 145b), Dresden, Germany, while Δ (037) is at Saint Gallen, in Switzerland.

See also 
 Codex Augiensis
 List of New Testament Latin manuscripts
 List of New Testament uncials

References

Further reading 
 Peter Corssen, Epistularum Paulinarum Latine Scriptos Augiensem, Boernerianum, Claromontanum, Jever Druck von H. Fiencke 1887-1889. 
 W. H. P. Hatch, On the Relationship of Codex Augiensis and Codex Boernerianus of the Pauline Epistles, Harvard Studies in Classical Philology, Vol. 60, 1951, pp. 187–199.
 Alexander Reichardt, Der Codex Boernerianus. Der Briefe des Apostels Paulus, Verlag von Karl W. Hiersemann, Leipzig 1909.
 Bruce M. Metzger, Manuscripts of the Greek Bible: An Introduction to Palaeography, Oxford University Press, Oxford 1981, pp. 104–105.

External links 

 
 Codex Boernerianus Gp (012) at the CSNTM (images of the 1909 facsimile edition)
 Codex Boernerianus Gp (012) recently made photos at SLUB Dresden Digitale Bibliothek
 Codex Boernerianus recently made photos at SLUB Dresden Digitale Bibliothek (PDF)
 Manuscript Gp (012) at the Encyclopedia of Textual Criticism

Greek New Testament uncials
Vetus Latina New Testament manuscripts
9th-century biblical manuscripts